Podgora is a settlement on the left bank of the Poljane Sora River near Gorenja Vas in the Municipality of Gorenja Vas–Poljane in the Upper Carniola region of Slovenia.

References

External links 

Podgora on Geopedia

Populated places in the Municipality of Gorenja vas-Poljane